The following is a list of notable people belonging to Angami Naga people.

Chakhro Angami

Tsiepama 
Rokonicha Kuotsü (1946–2019), Politician

Northern Angami

Kohima 

 Neidonuo Angami, Social Worker; Shortlisted for the Nobel Peace Prize in 2000
 Easterine Kire, Writer
 Khriehu Liezietsu, Politician from Northern Angami I constituency
 Shürhozelie Liezietsu, Chief Minister of Nagaland (22 February 2017 – 19 July 2017)
 Methaneilie Solo, Composer and Singer
 Mengu Süokhrie, Actress and Singer
 Jonathan Yhome, Singer

Nerhema 
 Neikezhakuo Kengurüse (1974–1999), Kargil Martyr and Mahavir Chakra Awardee
 Neiliezhü Üsou (1941–2009), Baptist Preacher, Church Musician and Public Figure

Tuophema
 Neiphiu Rio, four-time Chief Minister of Nagaland and Member of Parliament of the Lok Sabha.
 Zhaleo Rio, Politician from Ghaspani II constituency

Southern Angami

Kigwema 

 Sesino Yhoshü, Filmmaker
 Vikho-o Yhoshü (1952–2019), Politician

Viswema 

 Holshe Khrie-o, Nagaland State Sepaktakraw Coach
 Viseyie Koso, first Naga Sportsman to represent India at an Asian Games (2010 Asian Games held in Guangzhou, Guangdong, China)
 Vizol Koso (1914–2008), fourth Chief Minister of Nagaland and also the first Naga pilot (Royal Indian Air Force during World War II)
 Zale Neikha, present member of Nagaland Legislative Assembly from Southern Angami II
 Viswesül Pusa (1954–2017), Member of Nagaland Legislative Assembly from 1993 to 2013
 Tseilhoutuo Rhütso, member of Nagaland Legislative Assembly from Kohima Town Assembly constituency
 Vizadel Sakhrie (1943–1995), first Naga Medical Specialist
 Hovithal Sothü, project director at TAFMA
 Kropol Vitsü, member of Nagaland Legislative Assembly from 2013 to 2018

Western Angami

Jotsoma 

 Reivilie Angami (1923–1998), Recipient of Burma Star, Brigadier in the Naga National Council
 Thepfülo-u Nakhro (1913–1986), Chief Minister of Nagaland from 1966 to 1969.
 Kiyanilie Peseyie (1941–2017), Politician

Khonoma 

 Kevichüsa Angami (1903–1990), Politician
 John Bosco Jasokie (1927–2005), Chief Minister of Nagaland (1975; 1980–1982).
 Andrea Kevichüsa, Actress and Model
 Chalie Kevichüsa (1943–1992), Journalist
 Razhukhrielie Kevichüsa (1941–2022), Bureaucrat and Musician
 Tubu Kevichüsa (1948–1996), General Secretary of the Naga National Council
 Salhoutuonuo Kruse, The first woman to be elected to the Nagaland Legislative Assembly
 Angami Zapu Phizo (1904–1990), Leader of Naga National Council

See also
 List of Naga people

References

Lists of people by ethnicity
Naga-related lists
Angami